Preesall railway station served Preesall in Lancashire, England, from 1908 to 1930, although goods continued until 1950.

History 
The station opened on 3 August 1908 by the Knott End Railway. It was situated on the east side of Park Lane. To the south was the goods yard which had a goods shed, a loading ramp, a crane and a weighbridge. The bus service introduced in the 1920s deemed the station uneconomic so it closed on 31 March 1930 and closed to goods on 13 November 1950. Only the platform face still remains.

References

External links 

Disused railway stations in the Borough of Wyre
The Fylde
Railway stations in Great Britain opened in 1908
Railway stations in Great Britain closed in 1930
1908 establishments in England
1950 disestablishments in England